Heithem Ben Salem (born 25 April 1988) is a retired Tunisian football striker.

References

1988 births
Living people
Tunisian footballers
CA Bizertin players
CS Sfaxien players
Stade Tunisien players
LPS Tozeur players
AS Marsa players
Étoile Sportive du Sahel players
JS Kairouan players
Association football forwards
Tunisian Ligue Professionnelle 1 players